is a song by South Korean girl group Rainbow. This is the group's third Japanese single and the first not to be re-recorded from Korean. The single was released on March 14, 2012, in four different editions: three limited editions (CD+DVD, CD and 28-page Photobook and a regular edition with a bonus track) and a regular edition.

Background
The single was first announced by the store Amazon Japan on February 12 and then officially announced by their Korean label, DSP Media, on February 15. The group did a handshake event to commemorate the release of the single. The event was realized in Tokyo on March 17 and in Osaka on March 18.

The limited edition of the regular edition comes with the song "Hoi Hoi", released by the sub-unit Rainbow Pixie, which is composed by the members SeungAh, Jisook and HyunYoung. The song was already released in South Korea as a digital single.

Composition
"Gonna Gonna Go!" was produced by Han Sang Won, same producer of the song "Not Your Girl", included as a B-side on the single "Mach", as well the Korean version, included on their debut EP Gossip Girl.

Music video
A teaser of the video was first introduced on the TV show ZIP! on February 24 and later revealed on YouTube by their Japanese label, Universal Sigma, on the same day. The preview was revealed along with the announcement of their debut Japanese album Over the Rainbow. The full music video premiered on the TV station Space Shower TV on February 27.

Live performance
The first TV live performance of the song was on TV Tokyo's show Melodix! on March 24. The group is scheduled to make another performance of the song on NTV's show Happy Music on April 6.

Track listing

Charts

Oricon

Other charts

Release history

External links
 Rainbow's Universal Music Japan official website

References

2012 songs
2012 singles
Rainbow (girl group) songs
Dance-pop songs
Japanese-language songs